Marisa planogyra is a species of freshwater snail in the Ampullariidae family.

Distribution 
M. planogyra has been found in Brazil, Colombia, Argentina, Venezuela, and Trinidad and Tobago.

References 

Ampullariidae
Freshwater snails
Taxa named by Henry Augustus Pilsbry
Gastropods described in 1933
Molluscs of Argentina
Molluscs of Brazil
Molluscs of Venezuela
Invertebrates of Colombia
Invertebrates of Trinidad and Tobago